The Angelus Foundation is a London-based charity that strives to highlight the risks associated with taking ‘legal highs’,  through research, education and advocacy. 

The Angelus Foundation was founded in 2009 by health practitioner Maryon Stewart. Her 21-year-old daughter Hester had died after consuming the then-legal high GBL in April 2009. The Foundation now brings together a group of experts, known as the Angelus Advisory Group, from the chemical, medical and behavioural sciences.

The foundation is creating in-school programmes and wider youth education programmes, supporting and educating parents on the dangers of 'legal highs', and continuing campaigns to change laws. It seeks to bring about widespread education and information which will lead to a change in the attitudes of young people towards legal highs.

The following people support the Foundation: The Duchess of Kent, Baroness Margaret Eaton, Lord Parry Mitchell, Baroness Susan Greenfield, the actors Cherie Lunghi and Felicity Kendal and celebrity presenter Jeff Leach.

Angelus is partnered with several charities including Kids Company, DrugFam, Mentor, The Prince’s Trust and YouthNet.  In 2012 the Angelus Foundation joined forces with the Amy Winehouse Foundation to front a national campaign to make drug and alcohol education compulsory as part of the national curriculum.

In 2012 in a submission to the Home Affairs Committee the Angelus Foundation questioned the effectiveness of the Misuse of Drugs Act 1971 and called for it to be reviewed 

The foundation backed an amendment to the Anti Social Behaviour, Crime and Policing Bill in December 2013. This amendment, Clause (56NA), sought to limit the supply and distribution of legal highs. This came after the Foundation published a study indicating that there were at least 250 headshops operating in the UK. The actual number was estimated to be much higher given the difficulty of measuring market stalls, festival vendors, and under the counter sales. The Angelus Foundation also worked alongside the Amy Winehouse Foundation throughout 2013 and launched a petition to 'Put effective drugs education on the National Curriculum' gathering 2538 signatures.

In 2014 Brownstock Music Festival made the decision to work with the Angelus Foundation after two festival goers died at the event in 2013 after taking legal highs.

When it was suggested by The Times that the UK government was considering licensing shops to sell legal highs the Angelus Foundation raised concerns that it could 'legitimise' their use. The government insisted that the remarks of Norman Baker had been taken out of context and ruled out any such policy.

References 

Charities based in London
Charities for young adults